Six Mile Run is a tributary of the Millstone River that drains a large area in central Franklin Township in Somerset County and as well western portions of North Brunswick and South Brunswick Townships in Middlesex County, New Jersey in the United States.

Name
Six Mile Run derives its name (along with other area streams including Mile Run, Three Mile Run, Nine Mile Run, and Ten Mile Run) from the distance early surveyors estimated it was from the point where the historic King's Highway (now Rt. 27) left the Raritan River at New Brunswick to the point the roadway crossed the stream.  The estimates were not very accurate but the stream names have remained in use ever since.

Course
Six Mile Run starts near Corporate Road in North Brunswick . It crosses Cozzens Lane, then flows through a residential development. It joins up with the drainage from a lake then crosses Rt. 27. It then joins with the Nine Mile Run, a major tributary, and crosses South Middlebush Rd. It then crosses Canal Road and drains into the Millstone River .

Accessibility
Six Mile Run is easily accessible in several places, including Cozzens Lane and the residential development. It also can be accessed at Route 27, South Middlebush Road, and Canal Road, as well as the D&R Canal Trail. It can be also accessed by trails in the Six Mile Run Reservoir Site.

Terrain
Six Mile Run is generally between rocky and muddy terrain. Near Cozzens Lane, the streambed is rocky with a muddy covering. It is quite deep in many places. Farther downstream in the residential development, the stream becomes more rocky and fast flowing. It then becomes rocky and deep near Route 27, and remains like that for most of its downstream course. It widens considerably when it joins the Nine Mile Run. Near its mouth, it has a mixture of pebbles and sand for its streambed. Many large fish are found in the deep pools near the Delaware and Raritan Canal.

Tributaries
Cross Brook
Middlebush Brook
Nine Mile Run
Steep Hill Brook
The Six Mile Run has a large unnamed tributary that flows northward, crossing Skillmans Lane, Bennets Lane, and Veronica Avenue.

Sister Tributaries
Beden Brook
Bear Brook
Cranbury Brook
Devils Brook
Harrys Brook
Heathcote Brook
Indian Run Brook
Little Bear Brook
Millstone Brook
Peace Brook
Rocky Brook
Royce Brook
Simonson Brook
Stony Brook
Ten Mile Run
Van Horn Brook

Gallery

See also
List of rivers of New Jersey

External links
https://web.archive.org/web/20051108113103/http://thewatershed.org/wm_category1_lvl2.php?id=C0_163_135
USGS Coordinates in Google Maps

Rivers of Middlesex County, New Jersey
Tributaries of the Raritan River
Rivers of New Jersey
Rivers of Somerset County, New Jersey